Besiberri del Mig is a mountain of the Massís del Besiberri, Catalonia, Spain. Located in the Pyrenees, it has an altitude of 2995.2 metres above sea level. 

This mountain has two summits, the Besiberri del Mig N or Pic Simó, 2,995.9 m, and the Besiberri del Mig S or Pic Jolís, 2,995.2 m. It is part of the Parc Nacional d'Aigüestortes i Estany de Sant Maurici protected area.

See also
Besiberri Sud
Besiberri Nord
Geology of the Pyrenees

References

 Map Vall de Boí. Granollers: Editorial Alpina.
 Buyse, Juan. Los tresmiles del Pirineo. Barcelona: Editorial Martínez Roca.

External links
 Besiberri summits

Mountains of Catalonia
Mountains of the Pyrenees
Two-thousanders of Spain